Sriranjani may refer to:

 Sriranjani (actress) (1906-1939), Telugu theater and film actress
 Sriranjani (junior) (1927-1974), Telugu and Tamil film actress
Sriranjini (Malayalam actress) (active in 2000s)
 Sriranjini (Tamil actress), Tamil supporting actress in 2000s